Sulaiman Khan Karrani (reigned: 1565–1572) was a Sultan of Bengal. He ascended to the throne after the death of his brother Taj Khan Karrani. According to the Riyaz-us-Salatin, he shifted the seat of government from Gaur to Tanda.

Sulaiman, his brother Taj and Sulaiman's sons Bayazid and Daud Khan Karrani ran a short-lived Afghan vassal state of Mughal emperor Akbar in Bengal. They dominated the area while Sulaiman paid homage to the Akbar.  The Afghans defeated by Akbar began to flock under his flag.  The Afghans were not technically the rulers of Bengal, the post was primarily nominal.

Relation with Akbar
Sulaiman Khan Karrani did not establish his own coinage during his reign, an act that would have been tantamount to declaring statehood to the ruling Mughals.  He also honored Akbar as the supreme ruler of Bengal by requiring that mosques read Akbar's name in the Khutbah, the sermon at the Friday congregational prayers in Bengal.  Historians cite these acts as keeping the diplomatic peace between Bengal and Mughal Empire during Akbar's lifetime.

Conquest of Cuttack
Though northern India and parts of southern India were ruled by the Muslim rulers, they had not yet been able to conquer Odisha. In 1568 Sulaiman Khan sent his son Bayazid Khan Karrani and the famous general Kalapahad (Kala Pahar) against Mukunda Deva, the king of Utkal (North Odisha). After a few major battles against the Odias, and aided by civil war elsewhere in Odisha, Sulaiman was able to bring the entire area under his rule. Kalapahad sacked the Jagannath temple and took Puri under control. Sulaiman Karrani appointed Ismail Khan Lodhi as Governor of Odisha and Qutlu Khan Lohani as Governor of Puri respectively.

Conquest of Koch Bihar
Sulaiman Khan Karrani is said to have sent Kalapahad against the Kamata (later Koch Bihar under the Mughals) king, Vishwa Singha. Kala Pahad crossed the Brahmaputra River and advanced as far as Tejapur (modern-day Dinajpur District, Bangladesh). He defeated and captured the Kamata general Shukla-Dhwaja, third son of Bishwa Singha. Later Shukla-Dhwaja was released and regained Koch Bihar.

Religion
Sulaiman was a devouted Muslim and built the Sona mosque in old Maldah.`Abd al-Qadir Bada'uni mentions that every morning Sulaiman would hold a devotional meeting with 150 Shaikhs and Ulama and only thereafter would go about transaction of state business

Death and succession
Sulaiman Karrani died on 11 October 1572, leaving his empire to his son, Bayazid Khan Karrani. He was buried in Tanda, the capital of his Sultanate.

See also
List of rulers of Bengal
History of Bengal
History of Bangladesh
History of India

References

1572 deaths
Year of birth unknown
Indian people of Pashtun descent
16th-century Indian monarchs
16th-century Afghan people
Karrani dynasty